Buzi River is a river in Mozambique. The Buzi River originates in the Eastern Highlands (or Manica Highlands) on the border of Mozambique and Zimbabwe, and flows eastward through Manica and Sofala provinces of Mozambique. It empties to the Mozambique Channel west of Beira, forming a large estuary with the Pungwe River.

Its mean annual discharge is 79 m³/s (2,790 cfs) at its mouth.

It often causes floods, frequently forming a floodplain together with the larger Pungwe River. Dombé and Búzi are situated on the banks of the river.

The Buzi and its principal tributaries rise in the Eastern Highlands, or Manica Highlands, along the border with Zimbabwe. Some of the Buzi's headwater streams rise in Zimbabwe, and in other places the international border follows the watershed boundary.

The Revué river is the main northern tributary, and its headwaters are in the Eastern Highlands near Machipanda. In 1968, Mozambique's colonial government built the hydroelectric Chicamba Dam across the Revué to create Lake Chicamba.

The Lucite River, known upstream in Zimbabwe as the Rusitu or Lusitu, is the central tributary, joining the Buzi above the Revué.

The Mossurize River joins the Buzi from the southwest, above the Lucite.

The Save River watershed lies west and southwest of the Buzi watershed. The Pungwe watershed lies to the north.

References 
 Pungwe River Project
 NASA: Earth from Space
 Project: Vulnerability mapping Búzi

Notes 

Geography of Manica Province
Geography of Sofala Province
Mozambique Channel
Rivers of Mozambique